Senior Chinese Unofficial Member denotes the highest-ranking ethnically Chinese member of the Legislative Council and Executive Council of Hong Kong under colonial British rule. As Chinese council members were frequently referred to as "Chinese Representatives", the senior member was also known as the "Senior Chinese Representative". In the later years of the colonial rule, many Senior Chinese Unofficial Member also served as Senior Unofficial Member at the same time.

History
In colonial Hong Kong government, an Unofficial Member of a council was a member who was not part of the council by virtue of their government office (i.e. not ex-officio). The first Unofficial Member of the Legislative Council who was ethnically Chinese was Ng Choy, a British-trained barrister who later went on to serve as Foreign Minister and acting Premier of the Republic of China. He was appointed to the Legislative Council in 1880.

The first ethnically Chinese Unofficial Member of the Executive Council was Sir Shouson Chow, a US-educated former Qing dynasty official, who was appointed in 1926.

Over the years, there were 22 ethnically Chinese Unofficial Members of the Legislative Council, and 11 of the Executive Council. Nine of them have served on both councils. The longest tenure was that of Sir Kai Ho, who served 24 years on the Legislative Council. Sir Shouson Chow served 10 years on the Executive Council, the longest on that council. The Senior Unofficial Member served as a leader or representative speaking on behalf of all Unofficial Members, and the Senior Chinese Unofficial Member performed an equivalent role for the ethnically Chinese Unofficial Members.

After the Second World War, the ethnically Chinese members of the two councils gradually increased, and as a result the Senior Unofficial Member was often the Senior Chinese Unofficial Member. From 1974 until the abolition of the colonical councils in 1997, the Senior Unofficial Member was always ethnically Chinese. As a result, the term "Senior Chinese Unofficial Member" gradually disappeared from the 1970s.

Executive Council

Legislative Council

See also
 Executive Council of Hong Kong
 Legislative Council of Hong Kong

References
 鍾士元，《香港回歸歷程－鍾士元回憶錄》，香港：中文大學出版社，2001年。
 鄭棟材,CHINESE UNOFFICIAL MEMBERS OF THE LEGISLATIVE AND EXECUTIVE COUNCILS IN HONG KONG UP TO 1941, 29 April 1968.
 Hansard, Hong Kong: HONG KONG LEGISLATIVE COUNCIL, 1884-1992.

Senior Chinese Unofficial Member
History of Hong Kong
Legislative Council of Hong Kong
Executive Council of Hong Kong
Senior legislators
Hong Kong-related lists